The 15th season of the television series Arthur was originally broadcast on PBS in the United States from October 10, 2011 to June 15, 2012 and contains 10 episodes, all of which are from the season 14 production, which have previously aired in other countries.  This is the last season in which Dallas Jokic, Robert Naylor, Lyle O'Donohoe, Dakota Goyo, and Alexina Cowan voice Arthur, D.W., the Brain, Timmy and Catherine, respectively. This is also the final season to be produced by Cookie Jar Entertainment and to be animated with traditional animation. In the next season, 9 Story Media Group produces this series and the show switches to Flash animation, and would also be the first season in the US to air in the 1080i widescreen format where it was previously only done in foreign markets.

Episodes

2011 American television seasons
2012 American television seasons
Arthur (TV series) seasons
2011 Canadian television seasons
2012 Canadian television seasons